Shelby Kisiel (born ) is an American individual rhythmic gymnast. She represents her nation at international competitions. She competed at world championships, including at the 2010 and 2011 World Rhythmic Gymnastics Championships.

References

1994 births
Living people
American rhythmic gymnasts
Place of birth missing (living people)
Gymnasts at the 2011 Pan American Games
Pan American Games competitors for the United States
21st-century American women